The Seventeen Mile Dam was constructed as part of the Camballin Irrigation Scheme by the Public Works Department of Western Australia.

It is now in a derelict state after years of floods have eroded its foundations. The dam was built across Uralla Creek, designed to hold water against its natural flow.

One employee died during a large flood after the boat he was in was swept over the spillway leaving the surviving employee to run the seventeen miles back to town to raise the alarm. 

The dam is particularly shallow and was designed to hold  of water. It was completed in 1957, built by the Public Works Department of Western Australia.

References
 Department of Agricultural - Camballin Irrigation Area - A summary of Cropping and Pasture Studies 1958-1970

External links
  Sat picture of dam site

Kimberley (Western Australia)
Dams completed in 1957
1957 establishments in Australia
Dams in Western Australia